The Meek's graphium (Graphium meeki) is a species of butterfly in the family Papilionidae. It is found in Papua New Guinea and the Solomon Islands.

Etymology

The name honours  the English bird collector and naturalist Albert Stewart Meek.

References

Graphium (butterfly)
Lepidoptera of New Guinea
Taxonomy articles created by Polbot
Butterflies described in 1901